Hieracium gronovii, commonly known as queendevil, hairy hawkweed, beaked hawkweed, and Gronovius' hawkweed, is a North American plant species in the tribe Cichorieae within the family Asteraceae. It is common and widespread across much of the continent from Ontario south as far as Florida, the Dominican Republic, and Panamá. The plant can be found in rocky, dry, open woods and in fields.

Leaves on the stem are alternate and smaller. The base of the stem is hairier than the upper stem. The upper stem also has fewer, smaller leaves.

References

gronovii
Flora of Central America
Flora of the Caribbean
Flora of North America
Plants described in 1753
Taxa named by Carl Linnaeus